The 1950 Southern Conference men's basketball tournament took place from March 1–3, 1950 at the Duke Indoor Stadium in Durham, North Carolina. The North Carolina State Wolfpack, led by head coach Everett Case, won their fifth Southern Conference title and received the automatic berth to the 1950 NCAA tournament.

Format
The top eight finishers of the conference's seventeen members were eligible for the tournament. Teams were seeded based on conference winning percentage. The tournament used a preset bracket consisting of three rounds.

Bracket

* Overtime game

See also
List of Southern Conference men's basketball champions

References

Tournament
Southern Conference men's basketball tournament
Southern Conference men's basketball tournament
Southern Conference men's basketball tournament
Basketball competitions in Durham, North Carolina
College sports tournaments in North Carolina
College basketball in North Carolina